Traganum is a genus of flowering plants belonging to the family Amaranthaceae.

Its native range is Macaronesia to Arabian Peninsula and Iraq.

Species:
 Traganum moquinii Webb ex Moq. 
 Traganum nudatum Delile

References

Amaranthaceae
Amaranthaceae genera